Apeitheion was a city of Malis in ancient Thessaly. 

Its location is unknown.

References

Populated places in ancient Thessaly
Former populated places in Greece
Malis (region)
Lost ancient cities and towns